Jacques Rouxel is a French production designer. He was nominated for an Academy Award in the category Best Art Direction for the film Cyrano de Bergerac.

Selected filmography
 Cyrano de Bergerac (1990)

References

External links

Year of birth missing (living people)
Living people
French production designers